Oxbow is a hamlet and census-designated place (CDP) in the town of Antwerp, Jefferson County, New York, United States. As of the 2010 census it had a population of 108.

History
It was founded in 1817 by Abraham Cooper, an ancestor of Ambassador Charles W. Yost. Located at Oxbow is the Dr. Abner Benton House (1819), listed on the National Register of Historic Places in 1984.

Geography
Oxbow is in northern Jefferson County, in the northern part of the town of Antwerp.

Demographics

References

Hamlets in New York (state)
Census-designated places in New York (state)
Census-designated places in Jefferson County, New York
Hamlets in Jefferson County, New York